Route 145 is a short highway in Mercer County, Missouri.  Its northern terminus is at Route B; its southern terminus is at U.S. Route 136.  There are no towns on the route.

Route description
Route 145 begins at an intersection with US 136 west of Princeton, heading north on a two-lane undivided road. The route passes through agricultural areas with some trees, curving northwest and running to the east of Lake Paho. The road heads west and crosses the lake, continuing through more rural areas. Route 145 comes to its northern terminus at an intersection with Route B.

History
This highway was designated as Route 136 by 1950, but was renumbered to Route 145 in 1951 when US 136 was created in Missouri.

Major intersections

References

145
Transportation in Mercer County, Missouri